Rumyan castle is a historical castle located in Borujerd County in Lorestan Province, The longevity of this fortress dates back to the Prehistoric times of ancient Iran.

References 

Castles in Iran